Oswaldo Estéfano Escobar Aguilar (born 20 May 1968) is a Roman Catholic bishop who serves as the current Bishop of the Diocese of Chalatenango.

References 

1968 births
21st-century Roman Catholic bishops in El Salvador
People from Chalatenango Department
Roman Catholic bishops of Chalatenango
Living people